The genus Asystasia belongs to the family Acanthaceae and comprises approximately 70 species found in the tropics, including the weedy species Asystasia gangetica.

Selected species
 Asystasia africana (S. Moore) C.B. Clarke
 Asystasia alba Ridl.
 Asystasia albiflora Ensermu
 Asystasia ammophila Ensermu
 Asystasia atriplicifolia Bremek.
 Asystasia bella (Harvey) Benth. et Hook.f.  
 Asystasia buettneri Lindau
 Asystasia calcicola Ensermu & Vollesen
 Asystasia calycina Benth.
 Asystasia charmian S.Moore
 Asystasia chelnoides Nees
 Asystasia chinensis S.Moore
 Asystasia comoroensis S.Moore
 Asystasia crispata Benth.
 Asystasia dalzelliana Santapau
 Asystasia decipiens Heine
 Asystasia gangetica (L.) T.Anderson
 Asystasia glandulifera Lindau
 Asystasia hedbergii Ensermu
 Asystasia longituba Lindau
 Asystasia minutiflora Ensermu & Vollesen
 Asystasia moorei Ensermu
 Asystasia mysorensis (Roth) T.Anderson
 Asystasia neesiana Nees
 Asystasia subbiflora C.B.Clarke
 Asystasia tanzaniensis Ensermu & Vollesen
 Asystasia vogeliana Benth.

External links
 W3Tropicos

	

 
Acanthaceae genera